Vasquero Diaz "Vagas" Ferguson (born March 6, 1957) is a former American college and professional football player who was a running back in the National Football League (NFL) for five seasons during the 1980s.  Ferguson played college football for the University of Notre Dame, and was recognized as an All-American.  He was selected in the first round of the 1980 NFL Draft, and played professionally for the New England Patriots, Cleveland Browns, and Houston Oilers of the NFL.

Ferguson was born in Richmond, Indiana.

Ferguson was named the outstanding offensive player of the 1978 Cotton Bowl Classic, which Notre Dame won 38-10 over Texas.

In 1979, his senior season at Notre Dame, Ferguson was voted to the All-America Team of the American Football Coaches Association. That year, he was the fifth ranked player in the nation in yards per rush and finished fifth in voting for the Heisman Trophy. He ranks third all-time for total yards gained (3,472) among Notre Dame running backs, having averaged 5.2 yards per carry.

Ferguson currently resides in Richmond, Indiana. He is employed in the athletic department at Richmond High School, and is president of the local chapter of the National Association for the Advancement of Colored People (NAACP).  

He is a member of the Indiana Football Hall of Fame.

References

1957 births
Living people
All-American college football players
American football running backs
Chicago Blitz players
Cleveland Browns players
Houston Oilers players
New England Patriots players
Notre Dame Fighting Irish football players
Players of American football from Indiana
Sportspeople from Richmond, Indiana